Alan Lee Gordon (April 22, 1944 – November 22, 2008) was an American songwriter best known for songs recorded by the Turtles, Petula Clark, and Barbra Streisand. Many of his songs were co-written with Gary Bonner, including the Turtles' "Happy Together" and Three Dog Night's "Celebrate".

He worked with various popular musicians, including Blues Magoos, Alice Cooper, the Archies, the O'Jays, Lynn Anderson, Flo & Eddie, Frank Zappa, Helen Reddy, Gary Lewis & the Playboys, Tammy Wynette, the Lovin' Spoonful, Bobby Darin, and Freddy Fender.

Career
Gordon was born in Natick, Massachusetts. In 1965, he and Garry Bonner formed the Magicians, a group which would also include Allan "Jake" Jacobs and John Townley. They released a single in November 1965, "An Invitation to Cry". It met with some success, but their popularity was confined primarily to the New York and New England area.

Gordon co-wrote, with Bonner, "Happy Together", originally recorded by the Turtles. In 1967, the Turtles version followed The Beatles' "Penny Lane" into the #1 slot on the Billboard Hot 100 chart, spending three weeks there. It was named one of the Top 50 songs of the 20th century by BMI, having generated over 5 million performances on American radio by 1999, placing it in the same league as the Beatles' "Yesterday", and "Mrs. Robinson" by Simon and Garfunkel.

Songs from Alan Gordon's catalogue have been featured in film, television, commercials and video games.  Some of the films that featured Gordon-penned songs include The Naked Gun, Muriel's Wedding, Shrek, The Simpsons Movie, 27 Dresses, and Freaky Friday. Television programs include The Simpsons, That '70s Show, ER, Scrubs, The Wonder Years, and American Idol.

Gordon died at his home in Scottsdale, Arizona on November 22, 2008, after a two-year battle with cancer. He was 64 years old.

Singles
1965: "An Invitation To Cry" by The Magicians
1967: "Girls in Love" performed by Gary Lewis & the Playboys
1967: "Jill" performed by Gary Lewis & the Playboys
1967: "Happy Together" performed by The Turtles
1967: "She'd Rather Be with Me" performed by The Turtles
1967: "She's My Girl" performed by The Turtles
1967: "You Know What I Mean" performed by The Turtles
1967: "Put the Clock Back on the Wall" by the E-Types
1967: "As Long As You're Here" by Zalman Yanovsky (of The Lovin' Spoonful)
1967: "The Cat in the Window (The Bird in the Sky)" performed by Petula Clark
1968: "Small Talk" performed by Lesley Gore
1968: "Small Talk" performed by Harpers Bizarre
1968: "('Til I) Run With You" performed by Lovin' Spoonful
1969: "Celebrate" performed by Three Dog Night
1970: "Me About You" performed by The Turtles
1976: "Gladiola" performed by Helen Reddy
1977: "My Heart Belongs to Me" performed by Barbra Streisand

References

1944 births
2008 deaths
People from Natick, Massachusetts
Songwriters from Massachusetts
Deaths from cancer in Arizona
Place of birth missing
20th-century American musicians